Hot & Saucy Pizza Girls is a 1978 American pornographic comedy film directed by Bob Chinn and starring Desireé Cousteau, John C. Holmes, and Candida Royalle.

Cast
 John C. Holmes as John
 Bob Chinn as Bob (as Danny Hussong)
 John Seeman as Inspector Blackie
 Desireé Cousteau as Ann Chovy
 Candida Royalle as Gino
 Laurien Dominique as Shakey
 Christine de Shaffer as Celeste

Home media
In 2014, the film was restored and released on DVD by Vinegar Syndrome.

References

External links
 
 
 

1970s pornographic films
1970s sex comedy films
American pornographic films
American sex comedy films
1978 comedy films
1978 films
1970s English-language films
Films directed by Bob Chinn
1970s American films